David Vanhoose (born 1957), is an economics professor at the Hankamer School of Business at Baylor University.  He currently holds the Herman W. Lay Professor of Private Enterprise title. He has written numerous text books and papers which are widely used in the field of economics.  His areas of focus are international economics, monetary economics, macroeconomics, and banking.  He did his graduate studies at the University of North Carolina at Chapel Hill, with a dissertation in Bank Market Structure and Monetary Policy.

Professional positions
Co-editor for Journal of Macroeconomics, 2012–present
Editor for Monetary Economics and Editorial Board member, Journal of Economics and Business, 1996–2008
Baylor University - Professor
University of Alabama - Professor
Indiana University - Assistant Professor

Books
International Monetary & Financial Economics (2014) 
E-Commerce Economics (2011, 2nd Edition) 
Global Economic Issues and Policies (2011, 2nd Edition) with Joseph P. Daniels 
The Industrial Organization of Banking (2010) 
International Monetary and Financial Economics (2005, 3rd Edition) with Joseph P. Daniels 
E-Commerce Economics (2003) 
Money Banking and Financial Markets (2003) 
Macroeconomics: Theory, Policies, and International Applications (2000) 
Macroeconomics: Theory, Policy, and International Applications (1997)

References

Sources
David VanHoose

1957 births
Living people
21st-century American economists
Baylor University faculty